Xyliphius kryptos is a species of banjo catfish endemic to Venezuela where it is found in the Lake Maracaibo basin.  It grows to a length of 11.0 cm.

References 

 

Aspredinidae
Catfish of South America
Fish of Venezuela
Endemic fauna of Venezuela
Fish described in 1983